The 1990–91 Sri Lankan cricket season was dominated by Sinhalese Sports Club who won both the country's major trophies.

Honours
 Lakspray Trophy – Sinhalese Sports Club
 Hatna Trophy – Sinhalese Sports Club
 Most runs – UNK Fernando 656 @ 65.60 (HS 160) 
 Most wickets – FS Ahangama 39 @ 14.89 (BB 5-44)

Test series
Sri Lanka played no home Test matches this season.

External sources
  CricInfo – brief history of Sri Lankan cricket
 CricketArchive – Tournaments in Sri Lanka

Further reading
 Wisden Cricketers' Almanack 1992

Sri Lankan cricket seasons from 1972–73 to 1999–2000